Samir Karabašić (born December 12, 1966) is a Bosnian slalom canoer who competed in the mid-1990s. He finished 41st in the K-1 event at the 1996 Summer Olympics in Atlanta.

References
 Sports-Reference.com Profile

1966 births
Bosnia and Herzegovina male canoeists
Canoeists at the 1996 Summer Olympics
Living people
Olympic canoeists of Bosnia and Herzegovina